George Edward Stanhope Molyneux Herbert, 5th Earl of Carnarvon,  (26 June 1866 – 5 April 1923), styled Lord Porchester until 1890, was an English peer and aristocrat best known as the financial backer of the search for and excavation of Tutankhamun's tomb in the Valley of the Kings.

Background and education
Styled Lord Porchester from birth, he was born at 66 Grosvenor Street, Mayfair, London, the only son of Henry Herbert, 4th Earl of Carnarvon, a distinguished Tory statesman, by his first wife Lady Evelyn Stanhope, daughter of Anne and George Stanhope, 6th Earl of Chesterfield. Aubrey Herbert was his half-brother. He was educated at Eton College and Trinity College, Cambridge. He inherited the Bretby Hall estate in Derbyshire from his maternal grandmother, Anne Elizabeth, Dowager Countess of Chesterfield in 1885, and succeeded his father in the earldom in 1890.

He was High Steward of Newbury.

Family

Lord Carnarvon married Almina Victoria Maria Alexandra Wombwell, alleged to be the illegitimate daughter of millionaire banker Alfred de Rothschild, of the Rothschild family, at St. Margaret's Church, Westminster, on 26 June 1895. Rothschild provided a marriage settlement of £500,000 (equivalent to £ in  pounds), and paid off all Lord Carnarvon's existing debts. The Carnarvons had two children:
 Henry George Herbert, 6th Earl of Carnarvon (1898–1987), who married Anne Catherine Tredick Wendell (d. 1977) and had one son (the 7th Earl) and one daughter. They divorced in 1936, and from 1939 to 1947, he was married to actress and dancer Tilly Losch.
 Lady Evelyn Leonora Almina Herbert (1901–1980), who married Sir Brograve Beauchamp, 2nd Baronet and had a daughter.

Horse racing
Exceedingly wealthy due to his marriage settlement, Carnarvon was at first best known as an owner of racehorses, and in 1902 he established Highclere Stud to breed thoroughbred racehorses. He joined the Jockey Club and, in 1905, was appointed one of the stewards at the new Newbury Racecourse, and acted as a steward at other racecourses. His family has maintained the connection ever since. His grandson, the 7th Earl, was racing manager to Queen Elizabeth II from 1969 until his death in 2001.

Egyptology

Lord Carnarvon was a keen motor car driver. In 1903, he suffered a serious motoring accident near Bad Schwalbach in Germany, after which he never fully recovered his health. After a lengthy convalescence, his doctors advised that he winter out of England, and from then on he and Lady Carnarvon often spent their winters in Egypt. Here, he became an enthusiastic amateur Egyptologist, and also bought Egyptian antiquities for their collection in England.

In 1907, Lord Carnarvon undertook to sponsor the excavation of nobles' tombs in Deir el-Bahri, near Thebes. He employed Howard Carter to undertake the work, on the recommendation of Gaston Maspero, director of the Egyptian Antiquities Department. In 1912, Carnarvon published Five Years' Exploration at Thebes, co-written with Carter, describing their excavations.

In 1914, Lord Carnarvon received the concession to dig in the Valley of the Kings, replacing Theodore Davis who had resigned. Carter again led the work, undertaking a systematic search of the Valley for any tombs missed by previous expeditions, in particular that of the Pharaoh Tutankhamun. Excavations were interrupted during the First World War, but resumed in late 1917. By 1922, little of significance had been found and Lord Carnarvon decided this would be the final year he would fund the work. However, on 4 November 1922, Carter was able to send a telegram to Lord Carnarvon, in England, saying: "At last we have made wonderful discovery in Valley; a magnificent tomb with seals intact; re-covered same for your arrival; congratulations".

Lord Carnarvon, accompanied by his daughter Lady Evelyn Herbert, returned to Egypt, arriving at Luxor on 23 November 1922. Both were present the next day when the full extent of the stairway to the tomb was cleared and a seal containing Tutankhamun's cartouche found on the outer doorway. This door was removed and the rubble filled corridor behind cleared, revealing the door of the tomb itself. Carnarvon was also present when, on 26 November, Carter made a tiny breach in the top left hand corner of this doorway, enabling him to peer in by the light of a candle. When Carnarvon asked, "Can you see anything?" Carter replied "Yes, wonderful things!”. The tomb was then secured, to be entered in the presence of an official of the Egyptian Department of Antiquities the next day. However that night, Carter, his assistant Arthur Callender, Carnarvon and Lady Evelyn apparently made an unauthorised visit, becoming the first people in modern times to enter the tomb. Some sources suggest that the group also entered the inner burial chamber. In this account, a small hole was found in the chamber's sealed doorway and Carter, Carnarvon and Lady Evelyn crawled through.

The next morning, 27 November, saw an inspection of the tomb in the presence of an Egyptian official. Callender rigged up electric lighting, illuminating a vast haul of items, including gilded couches, chests, thrones, and shrines. They also saw evidence of two further chambers, including the sealed doorway to the inner burial chamber, guarded by two life-size statues of Tutankhamun. In spite of evidence of break-ins in ancient times, the tomb was virtually intact, and would ultimately be found to contain over 5,000 items.

On 29 November, the tomb was officially opened in the presence of a number of invited dignitaries and Egyptian officials.

Lord Carnarvon travelled to England in December 1922, returning in January 1923 to be present at the official opening of the inner burial chamber on 16 February. Before the opening Carnarvon had sold the exclusive newspaper rights to report the excavation to The Times. While this helped finance the work, it created resentment both from other newspapers and from the Egyptian authorities, whose own press was also excluded.

Towards the end of February, a rift with Carter, probably caused by a disagreement on how to manage the supervising Egyptian authorities, temporarily closed excavation. Work recommenced in early March after Carnarvon apologised. This was to be Lord Carnarvon's last significant involvement in the excavation project, he falling seriously ill shortly afterwards.

Death

On 19 March 1923, Carnarvon suffered a severe mosquito bite which became infected after a razor cut. On 5 April, he died in the Continental-Savoy Hotel in Cairo caused, according to contemporaneous reports, by blood poisoning progressing to pneumonia. On 14 April, Lady Almina Carnarvon moved Lord Carnarvon's remains to England. His tomb appropriately reflects his archaeological interest, nestled within an ancient hill fort overlooking his family seat at Beacon Hill, Burghclere, Hampshire. Carnarvon was survived by his wife Almina, who subsequently remarried, and their two children.

After Lord Carnarvon's death, Carter continued the excavation. The Egyptian government however took ownership of the tomb's contents, and in April 1930 provided a grant of £35,000 to his heirs (equivalent to £ in  pounds).

Legends and speculations
Encouraged by newspaper speculation, the "Curse of Tutankhamun," or, the "Mummy's Curse," entered popular culture and was fuelled further by author Sir Arthur Conan Doyle's suggestion that Carnarvon's death had been caused by "elementals" created by Tutankhamun's priests to guard the royal tomb. Howard Carter dismissed such speculation as 'tommy-rot', commenting that "the sentiment of the Egyptologist ... is not one of fear, but of respect and awe ... entirely opposed to foolish superstitions".

Some of the stories were clearly fabricated, including that a curse had been found inscribed on the wall of the tomb, while a study showed that those involved in the tomb's discovery and clearance did not, on average, have a lower than average life expectancy. A study of documents and scholarly sources led The Lancet to conclude as unlikely that Carnarvon's death had anything to do with Tutankhamun's tomb, refuting another theory that exposure to toxic fungi (mycotoxins) had contributed to his demise. Although he was one of those to enter the tomb on several occasions, none of the other 25 from Europe were affected in the months after their entries. The cause of Carnarvon's death was reported as "'pneumonia supervening on [facial] erysipelas,' (a streptococcal infection of the skin and underlying soft tissue). Pneumonia was thought to be only one of various complications, arising from the progressively invasive infection, that eventually resulted in multiorgan failure." The Earl had been "prone to frequent and severe lung infections" according to The Lancet and there had been a "general belief ... that one acute attack of bronchitis could have killed him. In such a debilitated state, the Earl's immune system was easily overwhelmed by erysipelas".

In popular culture
Carnarvon has been portrayed several times in film, video game and television productions, with events portrayed with varying degrees of accuracy:
 By Harry Andrews in the 1980 Columbia Pictures Television production The Curse of King Tut's Tomb.
 By Julian Curry in the 1998 IMAX documentary Mysteries of Egypt.
 By Julian Wadham in the 2005 BBC docudrama Egypt.
 By Sam Neill in the 2016 ITV series Tutankhamun.
 In the film The Mummy the character Evelyn Carnahan is named in tribute to Lord Carnarvon's daughter Lady Evelyn whose father, although not named, is described as one of Egyptology's "finest patrons".
 'Lord Carnarvon' is the quest leader for the Archaeologist role in the classic text-based computer game NetHack.
 His country house, Highclere Castle, serves as the exterior and upstairs filming location of the ITV/PBS television series Downton Abbey. The below-stairs scenes were filmed on a set in London, as Highclere's basement is the home of Carnarvon's Egyptian collection. Highclere is owned by the present earl.

Works

References

Further reading
 with Howard Carter, Five Years' Explorations at Thebes – A Record of Work Done 1907–1911, ed. Paul Kegan, 2004.
 with Howard Carter, Five Years' Explorations at Thebes – A Record of Work Done 1907–1911, Original 1912 edition.
 Fiona Carnarvon, Egypt at Highclere – The discovery of Tutankhamun, Highclere Enterprises LPP, 2009.
 Fiona Carnarvon, Carnarvon & Carter – the story of the two Englishman who discovered the tomb of Tutankhamun, Highclere Enterprises LPP, 2007.
 Elisabeth David, Gaston Maspero 1846–1916, Pygmalion/Gérard Watelet, 1999.

External links

 George Herbert, 5th Earl of Carnarvon Bio at Highclere Castle
 Highclere Castle, home of the 5th Earl
 

1866 births
1923 deaths
George Herbert, 05th Earl of Carnarvon
British racehorse owners and breeders
Deaths due to insect bites and stings
5
English archaeologists
English Egyptologists
Infectious disease deaths in Egypt
People educated at Eton College
Alumni of Trinity College, Cambridge
20th-century archaeologists
Tutankhamun
People from Highclere